Leann Tilley is Professor of Biochemistry and Molecular Biology in the Bio21 Molecular Science and Biotechnology Institute, The University of Melbourne.

Education and awards
Leann Tilley was born in Edenhope, Victoria, and attended Marian College in Ararat. Following a BSc (Hons) in Biochemistry at the University of Melbourne, she obtained her PhD in Biochemistry from the University of Sydney. She completed postdoctoral fellowships at Utrecht University in the Netherlands, the College de France in Paris, and the University of Melbourne, before joining La Trobe University. In 2011 she moved to the Department of Biochemistry and Molecular Biology at the University of Melbourne.

Professor Tilley was awarded an Australian Research Council Georgina Sweet Australian Laureate Fellowship (2016-2020) to measure and model malaria parasites. This includes a role as an ambassador for women in science. Tilley's work has been recognised by the award of the title of Redmond Barry Distinguished Professor, University of Melbourne (2016), an Australian Research Council Australian Professorial Fellowship (2011-2015), the Bancroft-Mackerras Medal from the Australian Society for Parasitology and the Beckman Coulter Discovery Award of the Australian Society for Biochemistry and Molecular Biology. Her team was awarded the 2016 Eureka Award for Infectious Diseases Research. She was awarded the Bob Robertson Award of the Australian Society for Biophysics in 2017.

Research
Tilley's research focuses on the use of molecular approaches and imaging techniques to study the malaria parasite and its interactions with its host in an effort to develop novel therapies. Her scientific contributions have been in four main areas: 1) Establishing Imaging Facilities and Technologies. For example, Tilley has pioneered the application of methods such as Super-Resolution Optical Microscopy to studies of the malaria parasite. 2) Antimalarial Drug Action. For example, Tilley investigates the molecular basis of the resistance that is currently emerging to the antimalarial drug, artemisinin, with a view to extending the use of a drug that saves millions of lives, 3) Studying the unusual trafficking path that brings P. falciparum virulence proteins to the host red blood cell surface, and 4) Determining the molecular basis of the amazing shape-changing properties of the sexual stage gametocyte.

She served as Deputy Director (2005-2012) and Director (2013-2014) of the Australian Research Council Centre of Excellence for Coherent X-ray Science (CXS).

References

External links
PROF Leann TILLEY - The University Of Melbourne
Australian Society for Parasitology
 PROF Leann TILLEY, School of Biomedical Science, The University Of Melbourne

Academic staff of the University of Melbourne
University of Melbourne alumni
University of Sydney alumni
Utrecht University alumni
Academic staff of La Trobe University
Australian parasitologists
Malariologists
Living people
Year of birth missing (living people)
Australian women scientists
Australian women academics